Paudie Casey (born 1935) is an Irish retired hurler who played as a forward for club side Ballygunner and at inter-county level with the Waterford senior hurling team.

Honours

Ballygunner
Waterford Senior Hurling Championship (1): 1966, 1967, 1968
Waterford Junior Hurling Championship (1): 1957

Waterford
All-Ireland Senior Hurling Championship (1): 1959
Munster Senior Hurling Championship (1): 1959

References

1935 births
Living people
Ballygunner hurlers
Waterford inter-county hurlers